I Nyoman Nikson Ansanay (born 8 July 2001) is an Indonesian professional footballer who plays as a right back for Liga 2 club Persewar Waropen.

Club career

Persipura Jayapura
He was signed for Persipura Jayapura to play in Liga 1 in the 2019 season. Ansanay made his first-team debut on 18 May 2019 in a match against Persib Bandung at the Si Jalak Harupat Stadium, Soreang.

Persewar Waropen
On 16 June 2022, it was announced that Ansanay would be joining Persewar Waropen for the 2022-23 Liga 2 campaign.

Career statistics

Club

Notes

References

External links
 I Nyoman Ansanay at Soccerway

2001 births
Living people
Indonesian footballers
Persipura Jayapura players
Persewar Waropen players
Liga 1 (Indonesia) players
Liga 2 (Indonesia) players
Association football defenders
People from Jayapura
Sportspeople from Papua